Robert McKinley (born August 5, 1950) is a right-handed former professional tennis player for the ATP Tour. He is currently the assistant men's tennis coach at Texas A&M University.

As a professional player, McKinley reached as high as No. 50 in the ATP singles rankings, and reached the semi-finals of the 1972 U.S. Open doubles draw with partner Dick Stockton.

McKinley was a 4-time all-American at Trinity University in San Antonio, Texas, and captained Trinity's 1972 NCAA Men's Tennis Championship. He also led Trinity to the NCAA finals as a coach in 1977 and 1979, and was named the NCAA coach of the year after the 1977 season. As a junior player, he was once ranked No. 1 junior tennis player in the United States.

He is the brother of tennis player Chuck McKinley.

References

External links
 
 

Living people
American male tennis players
American tennis coaches
Tennis players from St. Louis
Tennis people from Missouri
Texas A&M Aggies men's tennis coaches
Trinity Tigers men's tennis players
1950 births
Trinity Tigers men's tennis coaches